The Araguaia State Park is a state park in the state of Mato Grosso, Brazil.
It protects an area of annually flooded cerrado in the transition to Amazon rainforest, and is rich in biodiversity.

Location

The Araguaia State Park is in the municipality of Novo Santo Antônio, Mato Grosso.
It borders the municipalities of São Félix do Araguaia and Ribeirão Cascalheira, and the state of Tocantins.
It is the southernmost part of the continuum of protected areas that extend along the right bank of the Araguaia River in Mato Grosso.
It is in the Araguaia basin between the Araguaia and its tributary the Rio das Mortes.

History

From the 1970s, driven by tax incentives, the state of Mato Grosso has converted huge areas of Amazon and cerrado forest into large-scale agro-pastoral systems. Most of the unoccupied land was in remote, inaccessible and protected areas.
The types of protected land depend on land use.
Thus 83.77% of permanently flooded land is protected, while only 3.87% of open treed savanna is protected.

The objectives were to protect water resources, allow movement of native fauna, preserve a representative sample of ecosystems in the area and support controlled public use, education and scientific research.
It was to be administered by the State Environment Foundation (FEMA).
The park was classed as IUCN protected area category II (national park).

At time of creation five years maximum were allowed for FEMA to prepare a management plan.
The park was modified by law 8.458 of 17 January 2006.
The management plan was published in 2007.
It was approved in December 2008.

On 27 June 2011 the state government published a law authorizing an "exchange" with the Fundação Nacional do Índio (Funai) that would bring the Xavante people of the Maraiwatsede Indigenous Territory (TI) into the park, and regularize ownership by squatters in the TI.
Funai responded that it had no interest in the exchange, which was unconstitutional since indigenous territory is inalienable.

Environment

The vegetation is in the transition between Amazon rainforest and the cerrado, which results in a high level of biodiversity.
The park is flooded annually.
Typical Amazon forest fauna include the robust capuchin monkey and howler monkey. 
Fauna of the cerrado include maned wolf (Chrysocyon brachyurus) and pampas deer (Ozotoceros bezoarticus).
Wetland fauna include marsh deer (Blastocerus dichotomus) and capybara (Hydrochoerus hydrochaeris).
The park is also home to aquatic animals such as Amazon river dolphin (Inia geoffrensis), giant otter (Pteronura brasiliensis) and turtles.

Footnotes

Sources

State parks of Brazil
Protected areas established in 2001
2001 establishments in Brazil
Protected areas of Mato Grosso